The following list of World Rallycross Championship drivers lists the 158 drivers who have entered or taken part in a World Championship rallycross event since the series' inception in 2014.

Drivers
Information below is correct up to and including the 2018 World RX of Norway.

By country
Information below is correct up to and including the 2018 World RX of Norway.

References

World Rallycross Championship